Thompson Falls State Park is a public recreation area occupying  on the banks of the Clark Fork River, two miles northwest of Thompson Falls, Montana. The state park features a boat launch, children's fishing pond, and riverside trail with mature pine forests surrounding 17 campsites, a group use area, picnicking facilities, birdwatching, and nature walks.

References

External links

Thompson Falls State Park Montana Fish, Wildlife & Parks

State parks of Montana
Protected areas of Sanders County, Montana
Protected areas established in 1960